The HP Media Vault is a home printer and file server from Hewlett-Packard that runs the Linux operating system although you can install Debian on the MV2

First Generation

The Media Vault's processor is a Broadcom BCM4785 MIPS-based system-on-a-chip running Linux and BusyBox v1.00-pre2 based firmware. It has 64 megabytes of RAM, one Gigabit Ethernet interface, and three USB 2.0 ports.

The capacity of the device may be expanded using the empty drive bay which can house an off-the-shelf Serial ATA hard drive. The maximum expanded capacity of MV1 (first-generation) devices is approximately 1.2TB due to memory limitations.

One of the advantages of the system is that if the primary drive is lost (which includes some system software which works in conjunction with the firmware) the system can be restored onto a replacement SATA hard drive using HP's nasrecovery software.

Since the device supports standard communications protocols (listed below), it can be accessed by Windows, Linux, Mac, and any other OS that supports the needed protocols.

Protocols
CIFS
DAAP (only by user customization)
DLNA
FTP
HTTP
NFS
Telnet (disabled by default)

Second Generation

The second generation of the MediaVault products is powered by an ARM9 Marvell Orion processor, and has 128MB of RAM. It has 1 Gigabit network connector, and 2 USB 2.0 ports. There are 2 internal disk bays which support any off the shelf SATA hard drive up to 1TB in size.

Support
Lee Devlin was the hardware architect for the HP Media Vault and he maintains an unofficial support site for the device. The site includes information on hard drive replacement, restoring a previous snapshot of your pc, photos of the device internals as well as setting up a Firefly/iTunes Experimental server amongst many other articles.

There is also a yahoo group that offers support.

External links

 HP Media Vault Frequently Asked Questions/Knowledge Base
 Yahoo HP Media Vault group
 HP Media Vault Flash Demo

References

HP storage servers
Home servers